Datuk Seri R.S. Thanenthiran (born 4 July 1963) is a Malaysian politician and businessman. He is the founder and current president of the Malaysia Makkal Sakti Party (MMSP).

Background
Thanenthiran was born on 4 July 1963 at Sungai Petani, Kedah. In 1990, he married Vaney Maniam and they have three children. Before entering politics Thanenthiran worked as a teacher.

Ideology
Thanenthiran and the MMSP's main ideology is to develop the education level of Malaysian Indians. Thanenthiran has called on political leaders to adopt at least one Tamil school.

References

External link
 

1963 births
Living people
People from Kedah
Malaysian people of Indian descent
Malaysian businesspeople
Malaysian politicians
Leaders of political parties in Malaysia
Malaysian political party founders
21st-century Malaysian politicians